Meadowbrook may refer to:

Places
Meadowbrook, Queensland, Australia, a suburb of Brisbane

United States
Meadowbrook, Alabama, an unincorporated community
Meadowbrook, California, a census-designated place
Meadowbrook, Cornwall, New York, a hamlet 
Meadowbrook, Illinois, an unincorporated community 
Meadowbrook, Indiana, an unincorporated community
Meadowbrook, Pennsylvania, an unincorporated community
Meadowbrook, Syracuse, New York, a neighborhood
Meadowbrook, Seattle, Washington, a neighborhood
Meadowbrook, Virginia, a census-designated place
Meadowbrook, Wisconsin, a town

Transportation
Meadowbrook (SEPTA station), in Abington, Pennsylvania
Meadowbrook (UTA station), in South Salt Lake, Utah
Meadowbrook State Parkway, on Long Island
Dodge Meadowbrook, a U.S. car from the 1950s
Medowbrook, a type of carriage

Other uses
Meadowbrook Farm, a former name of the Bank of New Hampshire Pavilion in New Hampshire
Meadowbrook Polo Club, on Long Island, New York
John Sweek House, Tualatin, Oregon, also known as Meadowbrook

See also
Meadowbrook Country Club (disambiguation)
Meadowbrook High School (disambiguation)
Meadow Brook (disambiguation)